"Spring Rain" is MAX's 23rd single on the Avex Trax label and their second ballad single. It was released on February 20, 2002 after the announcement of lead singer Mina's pregnancy and marriage. It was Mina's last single with the group before she was replaced by Aki on their next single, "Eternal White."

Music video
A music video for the single was filmed before the cancellation of MAX’s originally-planned fifth studio album. The music video intersperses the four members of MAX singing the song in a white room, with scenes of MAX walking throughout Tokyo, and scenes of Japanese schoolchildren sitting under a cherry blossom tree. The video ends with MAX witnessing a school graduation ceremony, and then fades to black. When the video fades back in after a few seconds, the track list of MAX’s second greatest hits album, Precious Collection 1995–2002, rolls in the style of the closing credits of a feature film, accompanying an instrumental piano version of the song, this time with a much slower tempo than the original version.

Track list

Production

Music
Spring Rain
 Arrangement - H-Wonder
 Guitars - Nozomi Fukukawa
 Background vocals - Yuko Ohtani
 Recording - Kenichi Nakamura, Masayuki Nakano
 Mixing - Kenichi Nakamura

Party Tune
 Arrangement - Masato Hiraide
 Bass - Kitaro Nakamura
 Background vocals - Yuko Ohtani
 Recording - Kenichi Nakamura, Masayuki Nakano
 Mixing - Masayuki Nakano

Art direction & design
 Art direction & design - Yoshitaka Sato
 Photography - Ryu Tamagawa
 Stylish - Yasuhiro Watanabe
 Hair - Taku
 Make-up - Masaki Tanishige
 Coordinator - Taizou Yasumoto

Charts
Oricon Sales Chart (Japan)

References

2002 singles
MAX (band) songs
2002 songs
Avex Trax singles